Servilia may refer to:

Ancient Roman women
Most from the gens Servilia, the most notable figures including:
Servilia (wife of Catulus) (2nd century BC), wife of Quintus Lutatius Catulus
Servilia (wife of Drusus) (2nd century BC), wife of Marcus Livius Drusus
Servilia (wife of Claudius) (2nd century BC), wife of Appius Claudius Pulcher
Servilia (mother of Brutus) (107–23 BC), mistress of Julius Caesar and mother of his assassin, Marcus Junius Brutus
Servilia (wife of Lucullus), younger full-sister of the above, second wife of the conqueror Lucius Licinius Lucullus
Servilia (niece of Cato), a niece of Cato the Younger who was left in his custody after the death of her parents
Servilia (wife of Lepidus), wife of Lepidus the Younger

Other uses
Servilia (opera), 1901 work by Russian composer Nikolay Rimsky-Korsakov
Servilia of the Junii, a fictionalized depiction of Servilia the mistress of Caesar in the Rome 2005-2007 TV series

See also
Marcia Servilia Sorana (40–66), the subject of Rimsky-Korsakov's play

Ancient Roman prosopographical lists of women
.